Premanand Shantaram Ramani (born 30 November 1938) is an Indian neurosurgeon and writer from the state of Goa. He is known for his work in Newcastle and his neurospinal surgery technique of "PLIF". He is currently the senior neurospinal surgeon at Lilavati Hospital, Mumbai. An annual marathon is held in his honour in Goa. It is titled "Dr P S Ramani Goa Marathon".

Early life
Ramani was born on 30 November 1938 to Ahilyabai and Shantaram, a forest officer, in the village of Wadi Talaulim in Goa. He was the fifth of six siblings (three boys and three girls). The siblings were mainly brought up by their mother, as their father was often away due to the nature of his work. Since a young age, Ramani loved to read. He completed his Primeiro Grau and Segundo Grau in the Portuguese medium. Since the family belonged to the lower economic background, he would walk to and from his school, the English medium AJ de Almeida High School in Ponda, every day. Working hard, he stood first in school and second in the state. He scored nearly a 100% in mathematics, at both the SSC examination of 1958. At the inter science examination of 1960, he secured a Distinction and won the Ambedkar Gold Medal. Following this, he was awarded a scholarship to Siddharth College, Bombay University. The headmaster recognised his talent and gave him permission to use a special room in the library; an honour that was only granted to one other student: Test cricketer Ramakant Desai. Scoring top marks in Biology, he decided to become a doctor and joined Topiwala National Medical College and B.Y.L. Nair Charitable Hospital, Mumbai after being briefly convinced by its Dean, Mr. Monteiro, a Goan (he had initially opted for KEM Hospital). There, he specialised in neurosurgery, after a growing fascination for the spine. After completing his MBBS in 1965, he completed his MS at Nair Hospital in 1968.

Career
Soon after completing his MS in Mumbai, Ramani turned down an offer to become the Dean and moved to Malmö, Sweden, to study Intracranial pressure monitoring in 1972. Shortly after, he moved to Newcastle upon Tyne, England, to complete his advanced studies in neurosurgery, leaving behind an offer to become the Dean. There, he became known for his successful treatment of the citizens of Newcastle, where many people suffered from back and spinal issues due to coal mining. He thus completed his doctorate from the Newcastle University Medical School, specializing in neurosurgery, in 1973. He was appointed on the Specialty Board of the Royal College of Surgeons of England. Despite his success abroad, he came back to India.

In 1973–1974, he was posted to Goa Medical College, where he again gained credit for his work, this time in his home state. After a few months, he moved to Mumbai, where he still resides.

In the medical fraternity, Ramani is well known for his innovations and techniques in neurosurgery. One of these is his technique of disc removal, called the "PLIF Ramani Technique". Devised in 1973, Posterior Lumbar Interbody Fission is a technique used extensively today to correct spondylolysis and spondylolisthesis.

He retired as the Professor and Head of the Department of Neurosurgery at LTM Medical College and Hospital, Bombay University (after completing more than two thousand brain operations per year), and as an Oncological Neuro-Spinal Surgeon at Tata Memorial Hospital in Mumbai. He has been the president of the Association of Neuro-Spinal Surgeons of India and the former president of the Neuro-trauma Society of India.

Currently, he is a practising neurosurgeon, and the senior neurospinal surgeon at Lilavati Hospital and Research Centre, Mumbai. He was involved in the spinal surgery of Sarika, ex-wife of award-winning actor and director Kamal Haasan, in 2001. He has even treated the Goan playwright, poet and politician Vishnu Wagh in 2016. Some of his other patients include Baba Amte, C. R. Vyas and Ramdev Baba's brother.

Books

Textbooks

Other works
 Ramani, P.S. 2022. Bhagwad Gita (in Marathi and English).
  (Autobiography)
  (Autobiography - translated)
 
 
 
 
 
  (Translated from Marathi)
  (Original in Marathi)
  (Translated from Marathi)
  (Original in Marathi)
  (Translated from Marathi)
  (Original in Marathi)

Personal life

Daily life 
Dr Ramani's daily routine begins by waking up at 4:30 a.m. and then meditating for 15 minutes. After a jog, he has breakfast and is ready to operate on patients by 8 a.m. at Lilavati Hospital. His consultancy then begins at 4 p.m. and goes on till 9:30 p.m. every day.

Family 
Ramani is married to a sociologist, Pratima. They got married about a week before Ramani's move to Newcastle. Together, they have two children. Their elder son Anoop is a laparoscopic urological surgeon who works actively in cases involving cancer of the kidney and prostate. For his work in the US, he was designated as the Director of Laproscopic Urological Surgery there. Ramani's younger daughter, Anjali, is a graduate of Sir J.J. School of Art and is currently working as a creative director. Till about 2006, he lived in Parsi Colony, Mumbai, following which he moved to Mahim.

Philanthropy
 
With an urge to do something for the people of his village, Ramani demolished his ancestral house, which was built in 1926, and built a one one-storey building, equipped with a library of 10,000 books, rooms that have 2,000 toys, a children's play garden, and a hall big enough for 200 people. He even built a modern gymnasium on this property, and offered all these facilities to the public, either for free or for a nominal fee. He even helped develop a sports complex on communidade land.

Ramani sponsors a cricket tournament and is actively involved in the "Dr Ramani Goa Marathon", organized by the Ahilyabai Ramani Pratishtan, an organisation founded by him in his mother's memory. He even participates in it. This event attracts people from all over the world. Ramani uses this opportunity to encourage youngsters to remain active and teaches them the importance of exercise, no matter the age.

Dr Ramani published and launched his 75th book: "Bhagwad Gita" on 7th July 2022.

Awards and accolades 

For his work in Newcastle, Dr Ramani was awarded the 1973 David Dickson Research Man of the Year award in England. He was the first Asian to win the Paul Bucy Award from the University of Chicago. In 2011, he was presented with a lifetime achievement award by the British Association of Spinal Surgeons, and Hungary issued a postage stamp to honour him. Soon after, a hospital in Cirebon, Indonesia named an operation theatre block after him. Closer home, the people of his village rewarded his philanthropy by naming a village road after him. His birthday, 30 November, is celebrated as Neuro Spinal Day in India. In 2018, he was awarded the Walter Dandy Neurosurgical Society's Dandy Medal in United States. He was chosen for the Gomant Vibhushan Award and the Saraswat Ratna Award in 2019. Dr Ramani was the Chief Guest at the Republic Day function of the Government of Goa on 26 January 2020.
Dr P S Ramani was awarded Life Time Achievement Award by World Federation of Neurosurgical Societies Spine Committee on 13 October 2021. In appreciation, Shanta Siddhi Charitable Trust and Saraswat Bank organised a felicitation for Dr P S Ramani on 27 November 2021. In his speech, Dr Ramani stressed the importance of positive thoughts in life to live long with contented mind.
Dr P S Ramani has created a museum in Goa containing his research work in Neuro Spinal Surgery as well as his social work and published books. The aim of museum is to adopt science, keep good health and maintain benevolent human relations.
Dr P S Ramani: "PRIDE OF GOA". Dr P S Ramani has been conferred 2022 Pride of Goa award by Global Herald. The function to confer this rare and prestigious award will be held on 27 March 2022 in Panaji Goa in Hotel JW Marriott. An Auditorium was made in honour of Dr PS Ramani and was inaugurated by Dean Dr Mohan Joshi on 15 september 2022 in LTMG Hospital , popularly known as Sion Hospital . Dr PS Ramani has spent best part of his professional life at this Institution  taking it to global heights.

References

External links
 

Living people
Indian neurosurgeons
Medical doctors from Goa
People from Mumbai
1938 births